"From the Bottom of My Heart" is an R&B song written by Chuck Willis recorded by both The Clovers and The Diamonds.

References

The Clovers songs
The Diamonds songs
Songs written by Chuck Willis
Year of song missing